Mohabat Subh Ka Sitara Hai is a Pakistani television tragic romantic drama serial that originally aired on the Hum TV from December 13, 2013, to May 16, 2014, comprising total of 23 episodes. it was also aired in India on Zindagi, premiering on 13 May 2016. The shows ended its run in India on June 8, 2016

Mohabat Subh Ka Sitara Hai is a drama series containing elements of family drama, tragedy and romance. It follows the life of an orphan girl, facing hardships after the demise of her parents and the life in her in-laws house after the death of her husband in a car crash. The story is primarily told in a serialized manner, featuring each episode of Romaisa's fate in love, respect and life.

Mohabat Subh Ka Sitara Hai was based on the novel Ye jo Subha ka Ik Sitara Hai by Umera Ahmad, who also shares writing credits as a screenwriter for the serial. Preceded by Ahmad's Kankar and Zindagi Gulzar Hai, it became the third consecutive serial that airs on Hum TV with same prime time timings. The serial was directed by veteran actress turn director Sakina Samo and produced by Momina Duraid. It was the fifth collaboration of Sakina with Ahmad since she directed her first ever serials Wujood-e-Laraib (2004) and Amar Bail (2005). The serial stars Meekal Zulfiqar, Sanam Jung and Adeel Hussain in lead roles with the supporting cast of Mansha Pasha, Farah Shah and Aini Zaidi.

At 3rd Hum Awards it was nominated for twelve Hum Awards, winning two as Best Actor Popular for Meekal Zulfiqar and Best Supporting Actress for Mansha Pasha. Mohabat Subh Ka Sitara Hai was declared the one of the best fourteen drama serials of 2014.

Plot
The story revolves around a poor orphan girl, Romaisa (Sanam Jung), who lives with her cruel and money-minded aunt (Farah Shah). The only loyal people in her life she had were her friend Nosheen, Nabeel and Zeeshan (brother of Nabeel). A rich businessman, Nabeel (Meekal Zulfiqar), falls in love with Romaisa and marries her. Nabeel's family - except for his younger brother, Zeeshan (Adeel Hussain) - behave badly with Romaisa. Aunt and cousins of Romaisa always demanded for luxuries from Romaisa and Nabeel. Nabeel never refused Romaisa and tried his best to make her happy. Some months after marriage, Nabeel dies in a car crash. Now, it was easy for his family to treat the meek Romaisa like an unpaid servant. Her aunt took her back in her home, as she knew that Nabeel had transferred a lot of money and a house on Romaisa's name. Her aunt wanted to file a petition in the court for the property of Romaisa and wanted her to marry her son (Sajid). But Zeeshan took her back in their house.

Again in her In-laws, her life is very hard, she have to done all works of house along with servants but she got none of appreciation from households. It is found that Nabeel has willed all his wealth to Romaisa, who is expecting his child. Soon, Romaisa and Nabeel's daughter, Maham, is born. Romaisa's father-in-law father coaxes Zeeshan to marry the young widow, pretending that this is for her security. But the real intention is that Nabeel's share of wealth should stay within the family. Zeeshan, an upright police officer, has already gone through a Nikah (wedding ceremony) with Rabia (Mira Sethi), though they are waiting for the rukhsati after which they can live together as a couple. His father suggests that Zeeshan could merely have a paper marriage with Romaisa. Zeeshan tries to discuss the matter with Rabia, but she demands a khula (divorce). Zeeshan finally agrees to marry Romaisa, but he remains indifferent to her.

Zeeshan is mostly away from home because of his job. One day, he gets shot in the course of his police duty. He has to remain with his family while he recovers. Romaisa takes care of him and he begins to understand her situation. He also gets attached to little Maham, and she starts calling him 'Papa'. Zeeshan's mother asks him to marry another girl and leave Romaisa to her fate, but he refuses. Now he realizes his parents' true intentions in arranging his marriage to Romaisa. He talks to his parents about it, and, disappointed with their attitude, decides to leave the house with Romaisa and Maham.

Cast

Following are list of main cast of drama serial:

 Sanam Jung as Romaisa Sikandar
 Mikaal Zulfiqar as Nabeel Sikandar 
 Adeel Hussain as Zeeshan Sikandar 
 Mansha Pasha as Aliya, Romaisa's aunt daughter. 
 Mira Sethi as Rabia, Zeeshan ex-wife 
 Farah Shah as Romaisa's Khala 
 Naeem Tahir as Nabeel and Zeeshan's father
 Annie Zaidi as Nabeel and Zeeshan's Mother
 Ali Tahir as Nabeel's elder brother 
 Tara Mehmood as Nabeel's brother wife 
 Hira Tareen as Hamna, Nabeel's sister and Romaisa's sister in law
 Hassan Noman as Hassan, Hira's husband and Nabeel's brother in law 
 Saniya Shamshad as Nayab, Nabeel brother's wife sister (Guest Appearance/cameo)
 Rashid Farooqi as Romaisa's father (only flashbacks)
 Kiran Fatima Bader as Jameela, Romaisa's sister friend.

 
While others roles were portrayed by Hassan Naaz, Akbar Salam, Humaira Banu, Kausar Siddiqui, Humaira Mughal, Mehreen, Javeria, Hanif Muhammad, Jia Bukhari, Ambar, Farhat Nazar, Arshma Khan, Urooj Abbas, Salma Qadir, Zahida Batool, Akbar Khan, Maryam, Anam Javed, Ali Hadi, Adnan Gabol, Waseem Dhamiyan, Farhad Fareed and Kiran.

Original soundtrack

The Theme song of Muhabbat Subha Ka Sitara Hai is its original soundtrack, written by Naseer Turabi the famous poet, and composed by Shani Arshad & Shaibi Arshad. The music is a label of Momina Duraid Productions. The song is sung by talented folk-Punjabi Indian singer Harshdeep Kaur who rose to fame by Katiya Karoon from the 2011 blockbuster Indian movie Rockstar. The lyrics were penned down by Naseer beautifully and gain a huge acclaim.

Track listing

Accolades

See also
 List of Pakistani actresses
 List of Pakistani actors
 List of Pakistani television serials

References

External links
 
 Official Website
 Hum TV's official Youtube
 Hum TV's official Dailymotion
 Hum TV's official Video channel

Urdu-language television shows
Pakistani drama television series
2013 Pakistani television series debuts
Hum TV original programming
2013 Pakistani television series endings